Lynne Green (born 2 April 1953) is an English former cricketer who played as a right-handed batter and right-arm medium bowler. She appeared in five One Day Internationals for Young England at the 1973 World Cup. She played domestic cricket for East Midlands.

References

External links
 
 

1963 births
Living people
Sportspeople from Mansfield
Cricketers from Nottinghamshire
Young England women cricketers
East Midlands women cricketers